Aaron Brant (born September 16, 1984) is a former American football offensive tackle.  He was originally drafted by the Chicago Bears of the National Football League (NFL) in the seventh round of the 2007 NFL Draft.

High school career
Brant attended Wahlert High School in Dubuque, Iowa, where he was named 1st Team All-State  as a senior.

College career
Brant played college football at Iowa State University.  In the 2003 season, Brant played offensive guard before moving to offensive tackle in the 2004 season.   Before Brant's final season in 2006, he was ranked among the top 13 offensive tackles in college football by the Sporting News.

Professional career
Picked in the last round of the 2007 NFL Draft by the Chicago Bears, Brant was waived on August 15, 2007, due to problems with his knees. Brant was the first drafted player to be cut in their first season by General Manager Jerry Angelo. KFFL

References

External links
Cornell College

1984 births
American football offensive linemen
Chicago Bears players
Iowa State Cyclones football players
Living people
Sportspeople from Dubuque, Iowa